No is the fifth studio album by American rock band Old Man Gloom. Though the album saw a limited release during the group's May 2012 tours, it saw official wide release on June 26, 2012, through Hydra Head Records. No is Old Man Gloom's first studio release since 2004's Christmas.

On May 29, 2012, the song "Common Species" was posted online for previewing.

Track listing
 "Grand Inversion" – 2:25
 "Common Species" – 7:59
 "Regain / Rejoin" – 2:31
 "To Carry the Flame" – 4:31
 "The Forking Path" – 4:13
 "Shadowed Hand" – 8:12
 "Rats" – 8:09
 "Crescent" – 4:25
 "Shuddering Earth" – 14:03

Personnel
Old Man Gloom
 Nate Newton
 Aaron Turner
 Santos Montano
 Caleb Scofield

Guest musicians
 Kevin Baker (The Hope Conspiracy, All Pigs Must Die)
 Kurt Ballou (Converge)
 Mike McKenzie (The Red Chord)

Production and recording
 Kurt Ballou – recording, mixing
 James Plotkin – mastering

Layout and design
 Abct – artwork
 Faith Coloccia – typography, art assistance

Charts

References

External links
 Full No artwork on Aaron Turner's blog

Old Man Gloom albums
Hydra Head Records albums
2012 albums
Albums produced by Kurt Ballou